The 2022 World Enduro Championship is the 33rd season of the FIM World Enduro Championship. The season consists of seven events.

Brad Freeman goes into the championship after winning both the EnduroGP and Enduro 3 classes in 2021. Andrea Verona is the reigning Enduro 1 champion, with Josep García going into the season after taking the Enduro 2 title the previous season.

This will be the first season in which Prime Stadium take up the role as championship promoter, with the previous season being under direct control of the FIM.

Calendar
A seven-round calendar was announced in October 2021. The calendar was later updated in January 2022, with the Swedish round cancelled and replaced with a second Portuguese round.

EnduroGP

Riders Championship

Enduro 1
Enduro 1 is for motorcycles up to and including 250cc, both 2-stroke and 4-stroke.

Riders Championship

Enduro 2
Enduro 2 is for 4-stroke motorcycles from 255cc-450cc.

Riders Championship

Enduro 3
Enduro 3 is for 2-stroke motorcycles over 255cc and 4-stroke motorcycles over 455cc.

Riders Championship

Junior
All riders competing in the Junior world championships must be younger than 23 years of age on the 1st of January of the year of the championship.

Riders Championship

Junior 1
Junior 1 is for motorcycles up to and including 250cc, both 2-stroke and 4-stroke.

Riders Championship

Junior 2
Junior 2 is for motorcycles over 255cc, both 2-stroke and 4-stroke.

Riders Championship

Youth
All riders competing in the Youth world championship must be younger than 21 years of age on the 1st of January of the year of the championship.

Only 2-stroke motorcycles between 100cc-125cc can be used.

Riders Championship

Women
Competitors in the Women's world championship can compete on any capacity of motorcycle of their choosing.

Riders Championship

Open World Cup

Open 2-Stroke
Open 2-Stroke is for 2-stroke motorcycles of any engine capacity.

Riders Championship

Open 4-Stroke
Open 4-Stroke is for 4-stroke motorcycles of any engine capacity.

Riders Championship

References 

FIM Enduro